Necochea is a coastal partido and city area in the southeast of the Buenos Aires Province, Argentina. The seat of the municipality is the port of Necochea. 

In the census of 2001 Neochea Partido had a population density of exactly .

Geography
As of 2001 the district had about 90,000 inhabitants.

History
The partido was founded on July 19, 1865 and the settlement was founded on October 12, 1881 by Ángel Ignacio Murga.

The town of Necochea obtained its status as a city on July 26, 1911.

Geography
The partido has a salt-water lake known as El Lago de los Cisnes, (Swan's Lake).

Economy

The economy of Necochea benefits from an influx of tourists from Gran Buenos Aires during the summer vacation season (December–February).

The main elements of the non-tourist economy are farming, the production of agricultural chemicals and biodeisel.

Settlements
Necochea
Balneario Los Ángeles
Balneario Costa Bonita
Energía
La Dulce
Juan Nepomuceno Fernández
Ramón Santamarina y Claraz

1865 establishments in Argentina
Partidos of Buenos Aires Province